Kilmainham Gaol is a former prison in Kilmainham, Dublin, Ireland. It is now a museum run by the Office of Public Works, an agency of the Government of Ireland. Many Irish revolutionaries, including the leaders of the 1916 Easter Rising, were imprisoned and executed in the prison by the orders of the UK Government.

History
When it was first built in 1796, Kilmainham Gaol was called the "New Gaol" to distinguish it from the old prison it was intended to replace – a noisome dungeon, just a few hundred metres from the present site. It was officially called the County of Dublin Gaol, and was originally run by the Grand Jury for County Dublin.

Originally, public hangings took place at the front of the prison. However, from the 1820s onward very few hangings, public or private, took place at Kilmainham. A small hanging cell was built in the prison in 1891. It is located on the first floor, between the west wing and the east wing.

There was no segregation of prisoners; men, women and children were incarcerated up to 5 in each cell, with only a single candle for light and heat. Most of their time was spent in the cold and the dark, and each candle had to last for two weeks. Its cells were roughly 28 square metres in area.

Children were sometimes arrested for petty theft, the youngest said to be a seven-year-old child, while many of the adult prisoners were transported to Australia.

At Kilmainham, the poor conditions in which women prisoners were kept provided the spur for the next stage of development. As early as 1809, in his report, the Inspector had observed that male prisoners were supplied with iron bedsteads while females "lay on straw on the flags in the cells and common halls". Half a century later there was little improvement. The women's section, located in the west wing, remained overcrowded. In an attempt to relieve the overcrowding, 30 female cells were added to the Gaol in 1840. These improvements had not been made long before the Great Famine occurred, and Kilmainham was overwhelmed with the increase of prisoners.

Post-independence period

Kilmainham Gaol was decommissioned as a prison by the Irish Free State government in 1924. Seen principally as a site of oppression and suffering, there was at this time no declared interest in its preservation as a monument to the struggle for national independence. The jail's potential function as a location of national memory was also undercut and complicated by the fact that the first four Republican prisoners executed by the Free State government during the Irish Civil War  were shot in the prison yard.

The Irish Prison Board contemplated reopening it as a prison during the 1920s but all such plans were finally abandoned in 1929. In 1936 the government considered the demolition of the prison but the price of this undertaking was seen as prohibitive. Republican interest in the site began to develop from the late 1930s, most notably with the proposal by the National Graves Association, a Republican organisation, to preserve the site as both a museum and memorial to the 1916 Easter Rising. This proposal received no objections from the Commissioners of Public Works, who costed it at £600, and negotiations were entered into with the Department of Education about the possibility of relocating artefacts relating to the 1916 Rising housed in the National Museum to a new museum at the Kilmainham Gaol site. The Department of Education rejected this proposal seeing the site as unsuitable for this purpose and suggested instead that paintings of nationalist leaders could be installed in appropriate prison cells. However, with the advent of the Emergency the proposal was shelved for the duration of the war.

An architectural survey commissioned by the Office of Public Works after World War II revealed that the prison was in a ruinous condition. With the Department of Education still intransigent to the site's conversion to a nationalist museum and with no other apparent function for the building, the Commissioners of Public Works proposed only the prison yard and those cell blocks deemed to be of national importance should be preserved and that the rest of the site should be demolished. This proposal was not acted upon.

In 1953 the Department of the Taoiseach, as part of a scheme to generate employment, re-considered the proposal of the National Graves Association to restore the prison and establish a museum at the site. However, no advance was made and the material condition of the prison continued to deteriorate.

Kilmainham Gaol Restoration Society

From the late 1950s, a grassroots movement for the preservation of Kilmainham Gaol began to develop. Provoked by reports that the Office of Public Works was accepting tenders for the demolition of the building, Lorcan C.G. Leonard, a young engineer from the north side of Dublin, along with a small number of like-minded nationalists, formed the Kilmainham Gaol Restoration Society in 1958. In order to offset any potential division among its members, the society agreed that they should not address any of the events connected with the Civil War period in relation to the restoration project. Instead, a narrative of the unified national struggle was to be articulated. A scheme was then devised that the prison should be restored and a museum built using voluntary labour and donated materials.

With momentum for the project growing, the Irish Congress of Trade Unions informed the society that they would not oppose their plan and the Building Trades Council gave it their support. It is also likely that Dublin Corporation, which had shown an interest in the preservation of the prison, supported the proposal. At this time the Irish government was coming under increasing pressure from the National Graves Association and the Old IRA Literary and Debating Society to take action to preserve the site. Thus, when the society submitted their plan in late 1958 the government looked favourably on a proposal that would achieve this goal without occasioning any significant financial commitment from the state.

In February 1960 the society's detailed plan for the restoration project, which notably also envisioned the site's development as a tourist attraction, received the approval of the notoriously parsimonious Department of Finance. The formal handing over of prison keys to a board of trustees, composed of five members nominated by the society and two by the government, occurred in May 1960. The trustees were charged a nominal rent of one penny rent per annum to extend for a period of five years at which point it was envisaged that the restored prison would be permanently transferred to the trustees' custodial care.

Commencing with a workforce of sixty volunteers in May 1960, the society set about clearing the overgrown vegetation, trees, fallen masonry and bird droppings from the site. By 1962 the symbolically important prison yard where the leaders of the 1916 Rising were executed had been cleared of rubble and weeds and the restoration of the Victorian section of the prison was nearing completion. It opened to the public on 10 April 1966. The final restoration of the site was completed in 1971 when Kilmainham Gaol chapel was re-opened to the public having been reroofed and re-floored and with its altar reconstructed. The Magill family acted as residential caretakers, in particular, Joe Magill who worked on the restoration of the gaol from the start until the Gaol was handed over to the Office of Public works.

It now houses a museum on the history of Irish nationalism and offers guided tours of the building.  An art gallery on the top floor exhibits paintings, sculptures and jewellery of prisoners incarcerated in prisons all over contemporary Ireland.

Kilmainham Gaol is one of the biggest unoccupied prisons in Europe. Now empty of prisoners, it is filled with history.

In 2013, Kilmainham courthouse located beside the prison, which had remained in operation as a seat of the Dublin District court until 2008 was handed over to the OPW for refurbishment as part of a broader redevelopment of the Gaol and the surrounding Kilmainham Plaza in advance of the 100th anniversary of the 1916 Rising. The courthouse opened in 2015 as the attached visitor's centre for the Gaol.

Historical importance

Since its restoration, Kilmainham Gaol has been understood as one of the most important Irish monuments of the modern period, in relation to the narrative of the struggle for Irish independence. In the period of time extending from its opening in 1796 until its decommissioning in 1924 it had been, barring the notable exceptions of Daniel O'Connell and Michael Collins, a site of incarceration of significant Irish nationalist leaders of both the constitutional and physical force traditions. Thus, its history as an institution is intimately linked with the story of Irish nationalism. The majority of the Irish leaders in the rebellions of 1798, 1803, 1848, 1867 and 1916 were imprisoned there. It also housed prisoners during the Irish War of Independence (1919–21) and many of the anti-treaty forces during the civil war period. Charles Stewart Parnell was imprisoned in Kilmainham Gaol, along with most of his parliamentary colleagues, in 1881-82 when he signed the Kilmainham Treaty with William Gladstone.

Edmund Wellisha, the head guard at the prison, was convicted of undernourishing prisoners in support of the rebellion.

Former prisoners

 Henry Joy McCracken, 1796
 Rev. Sinclair Kelburn, 1797 
 Oliver Bond, 1798 (Bond, a native of St Johnston, County Donegal, was to die in the prison).
 James Bartholomew Blackwell, 1799
 James Napper Tandy, 1799
 Robert Emmet, 1803
 Anne Devlin, 1803
   Thomas Russell, 1803
 Michael Dwyer, 1803
 William Smith O'Brien, 1848
 Thomas Francis Meagher, 1848
 Jeremiah O'Donovan Rossa, 1867
 John O'Connor Power, 1868
 J. E. Kenny, 1881
 Charles Stewart Parnell, 1881
 William O'Brien, 1881
 James Joseph O'Kelly, 1881
 John Dillon, 1882
 Willie Redmond, 1882
 Joe Brady,  (Phoenix Park Murders) 1883
 Daniel Curley,  (Phoenix Park Murders)  1883
 Tim Kelly,  (Phoenix Park Murders) 1883
 Thomas Caffrey,  (Phoenix Park Murders) 1883
 Michael Fagan,  (Phoenix Park Murders) 1883
 Michael Davitt
 Patrick Pearse, 1916
 Willie Pearse, (Younger brother of Patrick Pearse) 1916
 James Connolly, (Executed, but not held, at Kilmainham) 1916
 Conn Colbert, 1916
 Constance Markievicz, 1916
 Éamon de Valera, 1916 and 1923
 Paul Galligan, 1916
 John MacBride, 1916
 Joseph Plunkett, 1916
 Michael O'Hanrahan, 1916
 Edward Daly, 1916
 Seán Mac Diarmada, 1916
 Grace Gifford, (wife of Joseph Plunkett) (1922)
 Ernie O'Malley, during the War of Independence and the Civil War
 Peadar O'Donnell, during the Civil War
 Frank McBreen, during War of Independence
 Thomas MacDonagh, 1916
 Thomas Clarke, 1916
 Mairead De Lappe, During the Civil War. (Mother of broadcaster Proinsias Mac Aonghusa)
 Madeleine ffrench-Mullen, 1916
 Bridie O'Mullane,

Films
The following films have been filmed at Kilmainham Gaol:
 The Quare Fellow, 1962
 The Face of Fu Manchu, 1965 (starring Christopher Lee)
 The Italian Job, 1969
 Sitting Target, 1972 (starring Oliver Reed)
 The Mackintosh Man, 1973
 The Last Remake of Beau Geste, 1977
 The Whistle Blower, 1987
 The Babe, 1992
 In the Name of the Father, 1993
 Michael Collins, 1996
 The Adventures of the Young Indiana Jones (2000) – Love's Sweet Song
 The Escapist, 2008 (starring Brian Cox)
 The Wind That Shakes the Barley, 2006
 Paddington 2, 2017 (interior)

A music video for the U2 song "A Celebration" was filmed in Kilmainham Gaol in July 1982. The prison hosted a live performance from Irish band  Fontaines D.C. on June 14, 2020, with the accompanying live album released as part of Record Store Day 2021.
The prison was also used in the 2015 AMC series Into the Badlands, the 2012 BBC series Ripper Street, and the 2011 series of ITV's Primeval.

Photographs
More photographs in Wikimedia Commons

See also
 Prisons in Ireland

References

External links

Kilmainham Gaol

1796 establishments in Ireland
1924 disestablishments in Ireland
Defunct prisons in the Republic of Ireland
Prison museums in the Republic of Ireland
National Monuments in County Dublin
Museums in Dublin (city)
Gaol
Buildings and structures completed in 1796